The Swedish Short Course Swimming Championships are annually in late November in an indoor 25m pool. The championships sometimes also works as trials for the World Championships and European Short Course Swimming Championships. Swimmers representing Swedish swim teams may participate. Non-Swedish swimmers who have participated include Anthony Ervin and Attila Czene.

History

The first Swedish Short Course Swimming Championships was swum in 1953 in Stockholm, but the first Swedish Swimming Championship was held in 1899.

On the first championship, the events were 50 m freestyle, 200 m backstroke, 100 m butterfly and 4×50 m freestyle relay for men and women. Swimmers from SK Neptun won three of the events, while SK Poseidon's swimmers won two.

Two times the Short Course Championships has been swum in long course in pools, in 1988, when it worked as 1988 Summer Olympics trials and in 1990, when it worked as 1991 World Aquatics Championships trials.

The swimmer with the most individual gold medals is Therese Alshammar (41 titles), Anders Holmertz (33), Agneta Eriksson (24) and Thomas Lejdström and Johanna Sjöberg (both 20). Of them, Therese Alshammar is the only swimmer still active.

Champions

Venues

1953 – Stockholm
1954 – Stockholm
1955 – Stockholm
1956 – Valhallabadet, Gothenburg
1957 – Simhallsbadet, Malmö
1958 – Stockholm
1959 – Simhallsbadet, Helsingborg
1960 – Stockholm
1961 – Gävle
1962 – Valhallabadet, Gothenburg
1963 – Simhallsbadet, Malmö
1964 – Kristianborgsbadet, Västerås
1965 – Kristinehamn
1966 – Simhallsbadet, Helsingborg
1967 – Kristianborgsbadet, Västerås
1968 – Halmstad
1969 – Maserhallen, Borlänge
1970 – Linköpings simhall, Linköping
1971 – Sporthallsbadet, Sundsvall
1972 – Umeå simhall, Umeå
1973 – Växjö simhall, Växjö
1974 – Linköpings simhall, Linköping
1975 – Lugnets simhall, Falun
1976 – Valhallabadet, Gothenburg
1977 – Umeå simhall, Umeå
1978 – Simhallsbadet, Malmö
1979 – Kristianborgsbadet, Västerås
1980 – Maserhallen, Borlänge
1981 – Linköpings simhall, Linköping
1982 – Valhallabadet, Gothenburg
1983 – Jakobsbergs simhall, Järfälla
1984 – Centralbadet, Norrköping
1985 – Sporthallsbadet, Sundsvall
1986 – Simhallsbadet, Malmö
1987 – Linköpings simhall, Linköping
1988 – Gustavsviksbadet, Örebro (LCM)
1989 – Aq-Va-Kul, Malmö
1990 – Valhallabadet, Gothenburg (LCM)
1991 – Sydpoolen, Södertälje
1992 – Centralbadet, Norrköping
1993 – Linköpings simhall, Linköping
1994 – Sporthallsbadet, Sundsvall
1995 – Växjö simhall, Växjö
1996 – Sporthallsbadet, Sundsvall
1997 – Kristianborgsbadet, Västerås
1998 – Tivolibadet, Kristianstad
1999 – Sydpoolen, Södertälje
2000 – Eriksdalsbadet, Stockholm
2001 – Aq-Va-Kul, Malmö
2002 – Valhallabadet, Gothenburg
2003 – Eriksdalsbadet, Stockholm
2004 – Aq-Va-Kul, Malmö
2005 – Valhallabadet, Gothenburg
2006 – Fyrishov, Uppsala
2007 – Rosenlundsbadet, Jönköping
2008 – Aq-Va-Kul, Malmö
2009 – Gothenburg
2010 – Stockholm
2011 – Stockholm
2012 – Helsingborg
2013 – Gothenburg
2014 – Stockholm
2015 – Helsingborg

See also
Swedish Swimming Grand Prix series
Swedish Swimming Championships
List of sporting events in Sweden

References

External links

 
1953 establishments in Sweden
Recurring sporting events established in 1953